Agrostis mannii is a species of grass in the family Poaceae. It is found in Cameroon and Equatorial Guinea. Its natural habitat is subtropical or tropical dry lowland grassland.

References

mannii
Flora of Cameroon
Flora of Equatorial Guinea
Near threatened plants
Taxonomy articles created by Polbot